Fast Friends may refer to:

Fast Friends (game show), a 1991 British game show
Fast Friends (novel), a 1991 novel by Jill Mansell
"Fast Friends" (Full House), a 1993 television episode